Catenovulum agarivorans  is a Gram-negative, aerobic bacterium from the genus of Catenovulum which has been isolated from seawater from the Yellow Sea in China.

References 

Alteromonadales
Bacteria described in 2011